Dyland & Lenny were a Puerto Rican reggaeton duo, consisting of Carlos Castillo Cruz (Dyland) and Julio Manuel González Távarez (Lenny).

Career 
Both had planned to become basketball players before making a career in music. They started their career in 2009. With Sony music, the duo made their debut with the album My World in 2010. The album was produced by Luny Tunes.  In 2009, they were also featured guests on "Rompiendo Cadenas," lead single from Latin Grammy Award winner Ana Bárbara. In 2010, they release a remix to "Quiere Pa' Que Te Quieran" with Ivy Queen.

On February 12, 2013, the duo released their second studio album called My World 2: The Secret Code, which contains collaborations with various artists such as J Alvarez, Pitbull, Yomo, Victor Manuelle, among others. Their biggest hits are "Nadie Te Amará Como Yo", "Quiere Pa' Que Te Quieran", "Caliente" and "Pégate Más". 

At the end of 2013 the separation of the duo was confirmed, Lenny Tavarez who is preparing his solo album, has an approach with producers Los De La Nazza, who include it in the mixtape El Imperio Nazza: Top Secret Edition. Lenny Tavárez had released some of his solo songs such as "La Nena" "Fantasias" and "Tortura". 

In 2016, he released another single entitled, "Si Tu Cama Hablara" featuring fellow Puerto Rican,  Cosculluela.

Discography
Studio albums

Singles

Collaborations

References

External links
 Official Site
 Dyland & Lenny at Facebook
 

Reggaeton duos
21st-century Puerto Rican male singers
Puerto Rican musical duos
Puerto Rican reggaeton musicians
Musical groups established in 2009
Musical groups disestablished in 2014
Sony Music Latin artists